Alexander Quinn may refer to:

 Alexander M. Quinn (1866–1906), U.S. Army soldier and Medal of Honor recipient
 Alexander James Quinn (1932–2013), bishop of the Catholic Church in the United States